= Caesium dibismuthide =

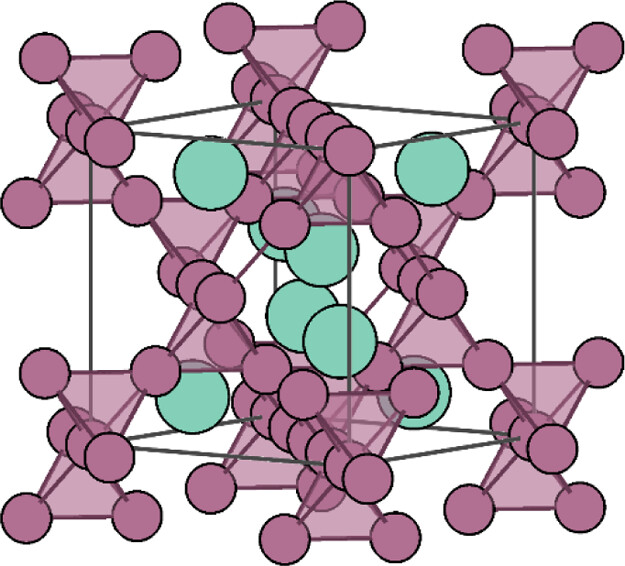

Identifiers
CAS Number	12048-44-1
3D model (JSmol)	Interactive image
- InChI: InChI=1S/2Bi.Cs Key: FRDGCOOVOGBFOY-UHFFFAOYSA-N
- SMILES: [Cs].[Bi].[Bi]

Properties
Chemical formula	Bi_{2}Cs
Molar mass	550.86625 g·mol^{−1}
Melting point	630 °C (1,166 °F; 903 K)
- Except where otherwise noted, data are given for materials in their standard state (at 25 °C [77 °F], 100 kPa). Infobox references

Caesium dibismuthide is an inorganic compound with the chemical formula CsBi_{2}. It can obtained by reacting bismuth and caesium at 650 °C and allowing it to cool down, obtaining light silver crystals. The crystals belong to the cubic Fd3̅m space group, and have a Cu_{2}Mg structure. Some sources point out that it is not sensitive to air and is slightly sensitive to moisture. However, other sources also mention that it decomposes and releases heat after being left in the air for a few minutes.
